The 2021 NCAA Division I men's basketball championship game was the final game of the 2021 NCAA Division I men's basketball tournament.

The Baylor Bears were crowned as the national champion for the 2020–21 season after beating the then-undefeated Gonzaga Bulldogs, 86–70. The game was played on April 5, 2021, at Lucas Oil Stadium in Indianapolis, Indiana.

Gonzaga was the first team to enter the national championship game undefeated since Indiana State in 1979. Baylor became the second consecutive first-time NCAA champions following Virginia in 2019 (no tournament was held in 2020 due to the COVID-19 pandemic).

Participants
The championship game matched Baylor with Gonzaga. It was the sixth meeting between the two teams; Gonzaga entered the game leading the all-time series 5–0, with the last meeting resulting in an 83–71 win for Gonzaga in the second round of the 2019 NCAA tournament on March 23, 2019. This was the first championship game since 2005 to feature the top two overall seeds in the tournament.

This was the second consecutive championship game where both teams were playing for their programs' first NCAA title.

Baylor

Baylor, led by 18th-year head coach Scott Drew, finished the regular season with a record of 21–1, including wins over seven ranked teams. The Bears posted a 13–1 conference record, earning them the No. 1 seed in the Big 12 tournament, where they defeated No. 9 seed Kansas State in the quarterfinals before falling to No. 5 seed Oklahoma State in the semi-finals. They were awarded an at-large bid to the NCAA tournament and received the No. 1 seed in the South Regional. In the tournament, they defeated No. 16 seed Hartford and No. 9 seed Wisconsin to reach their fifth Sweet Sixteen. The Bears then defeated No. 5 seed Villanova and No. 3 seed Arkansas to win the South Regional and reach their third Final Four.

In the Final Four, Baylor soundly defeated No. 2 seed Houston, champions of the Midwest Regional, by a score of 78–59 to reach their second national title game; they entered seeking their first championship.

Gonzaga

Gonzaga, led by 22nd-year head coach Mark Few, finished the regular season with a perfect record of 24–0, including wins over four ranked teams. The Bulldogs posted a 15–0 conference record, earning them the No. 1 seed in the West Coast tournament, where they defeated No. 4 seed Saint Mary's and No. 2 seed BYU to win their 19th conference tournament championship. They received the No. 1 overall seed in the NCAA tournament and were placed in the West Regional. In the tournament, they defeated No. 16 seed Norfolk State and No. 8 seed Oklahoma to advance to their 11th Sweet Sixteen. Gonzaga then faced and defeated No. 5 seed Creighton and No. 6 seed USC to move to the Final Four for the second time.

In the Final Four, Gonzaga was matched up with No. 11 seed UCLA, the champions of the East Regional. A 3-point buzzer beater in overtime by Jalen Suggs won the game for the Bulldogs and gave Gonzaga their second national championship berth in program history; they entered seeking their first national title and the first unbeaten season in NCAA Division I men's basketball since Indiana in 1976.

Starting lineups

Game summary
After winning the jump ball, Baylor controlled much of the first half. The Bears jumped out to an early 9–0 lead with multiple baskets each from Davion Mitchell and Jared Butler before Gonzaga's Andrew Nembhard scored a free throw. Gonzaga's first field goal came nearly five minutes into the game, with Corey Kispert's three-pointer that narrowed the lead back to nine, after a Mitchell jumper pushed the lead to double digits. A layup by Jonathan Tchamwa Tchatchoua and a three-pointer by Butler pushed the lead to 12 points; shortly thereafter, a Drew Timme layup and a pair of Adam Flagler free throws kept the margin where it was, though it was extended to 15 within the next minute. Over the following several minutes, Baylor was able to take advantage of excellent offensive rebounding and Gonzaga turnovers to push the lead to 19, its highest point in the half and the largest deficit Gonzaga had faced all season. During the second part of the opening half, the game was much more even; Gonzaga was able to gradually chip away at the lead, with a last-second layup at the end of the half cutting the deficit to 10 at the break.

The second half started similarly to the first, though both teams came out scoring this time. The Bears increased their lead to 15 within the first two minutes, and Gonzaga again narrowed it to single digits momentarily with 14:30 to play. The teams traded scores for the next minute and a half, getting the score to 62–51 in favor of the Bears, before Baylor went on an 11–1 run, pushing the score to a game-high 20 points. Both teams began to see foul trouble affect them, as Baylor's Flo Thamba fouled out with 8:40 to play and Gonzaga's Timme was temporarily benched after accumulating four fouls shortly before. Baylor controlled the ball well throughout the half, committing their first second-half turnover with only eight minutes to play. The Bears kept the lead between 15 and 20 as the teams alternated scores over the remainder of the game. With around a minute to play, both teams substituted out most of their starters, and Baylor was able to run the remainder of the clock out to win their first national championship.

Media coverage
The championship game was televised in the United States by CBS. Jim Nantz provided play-by-play, while Bill Raftery and Grant Hill provided color commentary. Tracy Wolfson served as the sideline reporter. The pre-game show included analysis by Greg Gumbel, Clark Kellogg, and Kenny Smith; and the post-game show was anchored by Charles Barkley, Seth Davis, and Jim Jackson.

The broadcast was the least-watched national championship ever shown on broadcast television, as it pulled in 16.92 million viewers on CBS for an average rating of 9.4. This marked a 14% viewership decline from the last men's national championship broadcast, in 2019 between Virginia and Texas Tech.

Aftermath

The win gave Baylor their first national championship in school history, and denied Gonzaga their first title and the first NCAA Division I men's basketball perfect season since Indiana in 1976. The loss was Gonzaga's first and only of the season, as they ended the year with a 31–1 record, while Baylor improved to 28–2 with the victory. After the game, Baylor coach Scott Drew was presented with the national championship trophy, and Bears guard Jared Butler was named the Most Outstanding Player of the NCAA tournament. Baylor's win was widely considered an upset, with Gonzaga considered a "massive favorite" to win the title by ESPN and Yahoo!'s platforms. Gonzaga never led during the game, and their 70 points were the fewest they had scored all season; the Bulldogs entered the championship averaging 91.6 points per game, the best in the nation. In addition, this was also Baylor's first win over Gonzaga in program history; they were 0–5 in previous meetings. Baylor also became the first team from the state of Texas to win the national championship since Texas Western in 1966.

See also
 2021 NCAA Division I Women's Basketball Championship Game
 2021 NCAA Division I men's basketball tournament

Notes

References

External links
 2021 NCAA Division I Men's Final Four

Championship
NCAA Division I Men's Basketball Championship Games
Baylor Bears men's basketball
Gonzaga Bulldogs men's basketball
2021 in sports in Indiana
NCAA Division I Men's Basketball Championship Game
College basketball tournaments in Indiana
Basketball competitions in Indianapolis
2020s in Indianapolis